Pilot Knob is a 12,245-foot-elevation (3,732 meter) mountain summit located in Fresno County in the Sierra Nevada mountain range in northern California, United States. It is situated at the intersection of Piute Canyon and French Canyon, in the John Muir Wilderness, on land managed by Sierra National Forest. This mountain was likely named by the USGS during the 1907–09 survey for the Mt. Goddard Quadrangle, and the toponym has been officially adopted by the U.S. Board on Geographic Names.

Climate
According to the Köppen climate classification system, Pilot Knob is located in an alpine climate zone. Most weather fronts originate in the Pacific Ocean, and travel east toward the Sierra Nevada mountains. As fronts approach, they are forced upward by the peaks (orographic lift), causing them to drop their moisture in the form of rain or snowfall onto the range. Precipitation runoff from this mountain drains into Piute Creek which is a tributary of the South Fork San Joaquin River.

Gallery

See also
 
List of mountain peaks of California

References

Sierra National Forest
Mountains of Fresno County, California
Mountains of the John Muir Wilderness
North American 3000 m summits
Mountains of Northern California
Sierra Nevada (United States)